Tom Sneddon (22 August 1912 – 11 December 1983) was a Scottish football player and coach.

Career
Sneddon played as a full back for Queen of the South and Rochdale.

He was manager of Czechoslovakian club Slovan Bratislava during the 1947–48 season, and he managed the Dutch national team in 1948. He was also in charge of Hong Kong between 1954 and 1956, taking them to 3rd place in the 1956 AFC Asian Cup.

References

1912 births
1983 deaths
Scottish footballers
Scottish expatriate footballers
Scottish football managers
Scottish expatriate football managers
Queen of the South F.C. players
Rochdale A.F.C. players
English Football League players
Association football fullbacks
Expatriate football managers in the Netherlands
Expatriate football managers in Slovakia
ŠK Slovan Bratislava managers
Netherlands national football team managers
Expatriate football managers in Hong Kong
Hong Kong national football team managers
Scottish expatriate sportspeople in Slovakia
Scottish expatriate sportspeople in the Netherlands
Scottish expatriate sportspeople in Hong Kong
Sportspeople from Livingston, West Lothian
1956 AFC Asian Cup managers